Bungalora is a small town located in the Northern Rivers Region of New South Wales. It had a population of 69 in the 2016 census.

References 

Towns in New South Wales
Northern Rivers
Tweed Shire